Florian Guay was a politician in Quebec, Canada and a Member of the National Assembly of Quebec (MNA).

Background

He was born in Saint-Léon-de-Standon, Quebec on November 23, 1941. Prior to running for office, he was a Social Credit activist and managed a furniture store.

Provincial politics

Guay ran as a candidate of the Ralliement créditiste in the 1970 provincial election and won, becoming the Member of the National Assembly for the district of Dorchester.

During his term of office, the party was plagued by internal divisions.  While three MNAs remained loyal to Leader Camil Samson, Guay and the rest of the caucus withdrew their support and appointed Armand Bois as temporary leader, until a leadership convention could determine a new leader.

Eventually, the Samson faction re-joined the party and Yvon Dupuis was chosen as leader.  Nonetheless, Guay was defeated and finished third in the district of Beauce-Nord in 1973.

Town politics

Guay was City Councillor from 1974 to 1975 and Mayor from 1975 to 1979 in Saint-Léon-de-Standon.

Retirement

After leaving office, he worked as a building contractor.

See also
 History of Quebec

Footnotes

1941 births
Living people
Mayors of places in Quebec
Ralliement créditiste du Québec MNAs